Valeriano Joseph Rebello (born 5 March 1983) is an Indian footballer who plays as a defender for Mumbai.

External links
 
 Profile at Goal.com
 

Living people
1983 births
Indian footballers
People from South Goa district
Footballers from Goa
I-League players
Dempo SC players
Mumbai FC players
India international footballers
Association football defenders